Associazione Sportiva Dilettantistica Pink Sport Time, also known as Pink Bari, is a professional women's football team from Bari in southern Italy. It was founded in 2001 and competes in Serie A.

In August 2015, the club established firmer links with local men's club F.C. Bari 1908. The agreement was never fully realised and broke down completely in early 2018, amidst recriminations, as the male club teetered on the brink of financial collapse.

Players

Current squad

Former players

References

External links
 

Football clubs in Apulia
Women's football clubs in Italy
Association football clubs established in 2001
2001 establishments in Italy
Pink Sport Time